Canaries District is one of 10 districts (formerly called quarters) of the island nation of St. Lucia in the Caribbean Sea.   In 2010, the population of the region was 2,009 people, and they are mainly fishers and agricultural workers.  The main town in the area takes the same name as the district and is located down the western coast from Castries, the capital of the country. It is the smallest quarter of Saint Lucia, both by population and area.

History
The name Kanawe is derived from the Amerindian word for cooking pots, in the past Canaries had a large sugar plantation that ran inland up the valley that stretches in an easterly direction from the village. Records show that Canaries has existed since 1763 and the original settlers came from the neighboring island of Martinique.

Geography
There are eight rivers in Canaries Quarter:
Anse La Verdure River, 
Canaries River, 
Anse Cochon River, 
Ravine Chalon,   
Ravine Joseph,    
Ravine Combat,   
Ravine Tertillien,  
Ravine Parasol, 

The following coves, points and bays (Anse) are in the Canaries Quarter:
Anse des Canaries,  
Ane la Voutte, 
Anse Cochon,  
Anse la Verdure,  
Petit Trou, 
Point la Ville, 

The following mountains are in the quarter:
Mount Regnier,   
Mount Parasol,    
Mount Morton,  
Mount Marquis,  
Mount Houelmon,   

Populated places
There are three towns in Canaries Quarter:
Canaries, Saint Lucia, 
Theodorine,  
Anse La Verdure, 

There are two estates and one locality in the Canaries Quarter:
Anse La Verdure Estate, 
Chantin Estate, 
Saurot locality,

Government
The seat of the Canaries District is the town of Canaries.

The Canaries District is represented in the House of Assembly of Saint Lucia by the Honorable Wayne D. Girard,
Parliamentary Representative for the Anse La Raye/Canaries electoral constituency.

See also
Geography of Saint Lucia
List of cities in Saint Lucia
List of rivers of Saint Lucia
Districts of Saint Lucia

References

Quarters of Saint Lucia
Subdivisions of Saint Lucia
Saint Lucia, Quarters
Saint Lucia 1
First-level administrative divisions by country